Captain America's shield is a fictional item appearing in American comic books published by Marvel Comics. It is the primary defensive and offensive piece of equipment used by Captain America, and is intended to be an emblem of American culture.

Over the years, Captain America has used several shields of varying composition and design. His original heater shield first appeared in Captain America Comics #1 (March 1941), published by Marvel's 1940s predecessor, Timely Comics. The circular shield best associated with the character debuted in the next issue, Captain America Comics #2.

Original shield

In his debut, Captain America (secretly U.S. Army Private Steve Rogers) is equipped with a heater-style shield made from steel. After complaints by rival comic-book publisher MLJ that the design was too similar to that of its own patriotic hero the Shield, Timely Comics replaced the triangular shield with a disc-shaped one.

While the origin and fate of the original shield were not described in the original comics from the 1940s, the shield's fate was revealed decades later in 2001 through a retconned story. According to the tale, King T'Chaka of Wakanda met Captain America in early 1941 and gave him a sample of vibranium, an alien metal with unique vibration-absorption properties and found only in Wakanda and the Savage Land. The vibranium was used to make Captain America's circular shield, and his triangular one was retired.

Captain America received a second triangular shield that he used until given his disc-shaped shield, presented to him by President Franklin Roosevelt. This second triangular shield was kept in storage with Rogers' other personal effects after the war. It was recovered at some point after Rogers joined the superhero team the Avengers in The Avengers #4, and was kept at Avengers Mansion. It was destroyed by the supervillain Mr. Hyde during a raid on the mansion by Baron Zemo's Masters of Evil, and later "plucked from time" and restored by Zemo in Thunderbolts #105 (October 2006). The shield (along with other sentimental items thought destroyed) was returned to Captain America. A third triangular shield is kept in the Smithsonian Institution. It was used by Captain America when he foiled a terrorist attack on the museum itself after the loss of his usual shield; it was then given to him in gratitude. This shield is destroyed several issues later by a Kree alien warrior.

The shield destroyed by Hyde and restored by Zemo was eventually passed on to Elijah Bradley, the teenage hero known as the Patriot and leader of the Young Avengers.

Revised history
In 2010, the history of the original shield was revised. In the limited series Captain America/Black Panther: Flags of Our Fathers, Captain America, Sergeant Nick Fury and the Howling Commandos meet Azzari (grandfather of T'Challa)—the Black Panther and king of Wakanda during World War II. Aided by Wakandan military forces, they repel a series of Nazi attacks led by the Red Skull and Baron Strucker. During the battle, the Red Skull (wearing a battle-suit) crushes the triangular shield, and Captain America uses a circular vibranium shield provided by T'Challa to incapacitate the Skull. The weapon serves as the inspiration for the circular shield that the super-soldier begins using upon his return to America, and the encounter marks the beginning of friendly relations between the United States and Wakanda.

Circular shield

The round shield most associated with Captain America made its debut in Captain America Comics #2 (April 1941).

In Captain America #255 (March 1981), it is established that the shield was presented to Rogers by President Franklin D. Roosevelt. The shield is created by fictional American metallurgist Myron MacLain, who had been commissioned by the US government to create an indestructible armor material to aid the war effort. MacLain experiments with vibranium.

During one of his experiments to fuse vibranium with an experimental steel alloy, MacLain falls asleep and awakens to find that the resulting alloy had set in a tank hatch mold. However, he was not able to duplicate it, because as MacLain described it, "some unknown factor" was present during the experiment that he could not identify. The shield was then painted to become Captain America's weapon and symbol. MacLain would later attempt to recreate the shield's metal to no avail, his experiments instead eventually yielding the super-metal adamantium. While adamantium has been portrayed as practically indestructable, MacLain said was "no match" for the mysterious Vibranium/Proto-Adamantium shield.

Rogers' shield is more durable than regular adamantium and is essentially indestructible. The vibranium grants the shield unusual properties, allowing it to absorb all of the kinetic impact and vibrations from any blows that the shield receives without injuring Rogers in the process. The vibranium is also a factor in the way Rogers throws his shield: he often uses it to ricochet and strike multiple opponents or stationary objects with little loss of speed after each impact.

Soon after his revival from suspended animation and rescue by the Avengers, Rogers briefly experimented with Stark's modification of the shield which included a magnetic mechanism that enabled Rogers to hold the shield through a corresponding magnetic mechanism attached to his left glove, as well as communications equipment. These modifications allowed Rogers to launch the shield from his glove and control it mid-flight. However, Rogers decided to have those modifications removed and restored the holding straps since he found that he preferred to physically throw the shield himself and the electronic equipment spoiled the shield's balance to enable him to do that effectively.

After Rogers' death, S.H.I.E.L.D. takes over custody of the shield, with one replica on display in a museum, and another replica buried with Rogers. The real one is kept by S.H.I.E.L.D. to be used by the new Captain America, whenever they deem it appropriate to train a new one. After failing to find a S.H.I.E.L.D. agent capable of throwing it properly, Stark offers the shield to Clint Barton (known at that time as Ronin), who does manage to throw it. During his first outing as Captain America, Barton encounters the Young Avengers and scolds Kate Bishop for using the Hawkeye name. She tells him that the "Real Cap" gave her that name in honor of his at the time dead friend. This leads Barton to refuse to be Captain America. The shield is subsequently stolen by the Winter Soldier, who did not want anyone else to carry the shield. Inevitably, in an effort to honor Rogers' last wishes, Stark offers to let the Winter Soldier (Bucky Barnes) keep the shield, and to serve as the new Captain America. Bucky accepts. This offer is made "off the books", and only the two of them, the Black Widow, and the Falcon, are aware of the situation.

Although Bucky attempted to return the shield to Rogers after his resurrection, Rogers let Bucky keep it as he felt that he could do more good in his new role as Commander Steve Rogers rather than Captain America. Rogers used a photonic shield in its place when circumstances called for him to go into combat. He reclaimed the shield for good after Bucky was apparently killed during the Fear Itself event— Bucky really going underground after his past as the Winter Soldier was exposed— that also resulted in the shield being broken and reassembled by Asgardian blacksmiths, who add some of the mystical metal Uru to the reconstructed shield, making it even stronger than before, although it is left with a noticeable scar that Rogers decided to keep to give the shield character. This premise was not observed in subsequent storylines, or considered canon, as artists have not continued depicting the shield with the scar.

JLA/Avengers
In the 2003-2004 Marvel Comics/DC Comics inter-company crossover limited series JLA/Avengers, Superman is given the shield by Captain America to wield in battle in the final confrontation with Krona, and is impressed with its might. When he asks where he could get one just like it while battling foes, Thor replies, "Enjoy it while thou canst, Superman. There is none other like it in all the worlds". Throughout the final battle, the shield changes forms between the pointed shield and the circular shield due to various temporal ripples caused by Krona's equipment, and Superman even loses the shield altogether at one point when he morphs into his energy form while Cap reacquires the photonic shield, although the metal shield reappears on Superman's arm after he morphs back into his regular form.

Destruction of the shield

Over time the shield has been damaged or destroyed several times within the confines of the Earth-616 continuity:

 In Captain America #302, the supervillain assassin, Machete, managed to destroy the one section of the shield vulnerable to conventional weapons while Captain America wields it: its holding straps, which made the shield much more cumbersome to use as it had to be held by its rim until Rogers could escape and replace the straps.
 In The Avengers #215–216, the Molecule Man used his total control over matter to disintegrate the shield, along with Thor's hammer, Iron Man's armor, and the Silver Surfer's board. After he does so, he comments that the board's molecules are "weird", and while there are "odd forces interweaving" among the hammer's molecules, the shield is "weirdest of all". He later reassembles these items, with the exception of the armor, as the electronic circuits are too complicated for him to understand at that time.
 During the 1984-1985 Secret Wars limited series, the shield is partially destroyed by Doctor Doom, who has stolen the power of the godlike being known as the Beyonder. Even broken, Rogers is able to wield what is left as an effective weapon, with the shield largely retaining its balance when thrown. When the Beyonder reclaims its power, the heroes are temporarily granted the ability to realize their wishes. Rogers uses this to reconstruct the shield.
 During the 1991 miniseries The Infinity Gauntlet, Thanos, who possesses near-omnipotence via the Infinity Gauntlet, shatters the shield with a blow of his fist while in combat with Captain America. The shield is soon restored by Thanos' alleged granddaughter, Nebula, when she obtains the Gauntlet and uses it to undo the events of Thanos's temporary godhood, resulting in her erasing the death and destruction that Thanos had caused over the previous 24 hours.
 Due to a stray molecule being out of place when Rogers reconstructed the shield using the Beyonder's residual power, a vibranium "cancer" was introduced to the shield, spreading with each subsequent impact until it finally shattered after it was retrieved from the bottom of the ocean (Rogers having lost the shield during a previous mission until Namor retrieved it). Learning that the vibranium cancer could only be "cured" with the destruction of the shield, Rogers took the shield to the main vibranium deposit in Wakanda so that he could use a device created by Tony Stark to halt the 'cancer' before it could contaminate the Wakandan vibranium and destroy the world, only to be intercepted by the villain Klaw, who sought to absorb the power of the "cancer" and become stronger. Fortunately, the amount of energy Klaw had absorbed was released when he struck the shattered shield with full force after Rogers picked it up on reflex, resulting in Klaw unintentionally restoring the shield to its original state, realigning its molecules and destroying the cancer.
 In Avengers (vol. 3) #63 (March 2003), an enraged Thor, wielding the Odinforce, scrapes the shield. Thor later repairs it.
 During the 2011 miniseries Fear Itself, the Serpent, the Asgardian god of fear and brother to Odin, breaks it in half with his bare hands. After the battle, the shield is repaired by Asgardian dwarves and Tony Stark with added Asgardian uru-infused enhancements and Stark's own technology to make it stronger, though a scar is left, which the dwarves are unable to remove. Stark offers a solution to the scar, but Rogers declines, saying that it "gave the old girl a little bit of character". This premise was not observed in subsequent storylines, which did not depict the shield with the scar.

Other shields

 While Rogers was asleep in suspended animation, three other men used the identity of Captain America, all using steel replicas of the discus shield. The 1950s Captain America was placed in suspended animation after becoming mentally unstable. By the time he was revived years later, Rogers had returned. When the two clashed, the 1950s Captain America's shield was broken.
 In the 1980s, in a story written by Mark Gruenwald, Rogers chose to resign the mantle of Captain America, rather than submit to the orders of the United States government and took the alias of "The Captain" instead. During this period, the role of Captain America was assumed by John Walker, the former Super-Patriot, who used both the costume and the indestructible shield. In his new identity of "The Captain", Rogers initially used a pure adamantium shield provided by Tony Stark, but a falling out between the two as a result of the "Armor Wars" storyline led Rogers to return it. He then began to use a pure vibranium shield provided by the Black Panther. When Rogers returned to his Captain America identity, Walker became the U.S. Agent and returned the original shield to him. Walker would go on to have his own array of different shields over the years, the first of which appeared to be the last vibranium shield Rogers was using as the Captain. The U.S. Agent used shields with an eagle motif and one in the shape of a star, as well as a photonic energy shield.
 At one point, when Rogers was exiled from the United States and was briefly unable to use his shield, Sharon Carter provided him with a photonic energy shield designed to mimic a vibranium matrix. This shield was also able to turn into an energy staff that could be used as a weapon.
 During the time when the shield was lost in the Atlantic, Rogers tried using a pure adamantium shield, but was unable to get used to the balance. He also tried fighting without a shield but also found it awkward. While up against HYDRA agents in the Smithsonian, he picked up the triangular shield that was being exhibited there and used it for a time before it was crushed by a Kree warrior.
 Sharon Carter next provided him with another photonic shield, but one whose shape could be controlled to morph the energy field into a wider force field, a bo staff or even fire a projection of the shield. While he enjoyed the versatility, Rogers noticed a number of drawbacks, particularly its inability to ricochet. Rogers gave one of the energy shield gloves to a freedom fighter in an oppressive future he traveled to and received a replacement from S.H.I.E.L.D. when he got back to his own time. The photonic shield was eventually lost again in a confrontation with Ultron when Hank Pym's use of vibranium resulted in the destruction of the generator that created the shield, leading to Rogers finally reacquiring his original shield.
 In Secret Avengers, he uses a new energy shield which could be generated on either arm, or both, and was able to be thrown and ricochet off surfaces to hit targets before it dissipates, preventing enemies from using it against him. A new shield would be generated moments later. Moon Knight, who had acquired a copy of the technology, had it described to him as a "zero point energy shield".
 In Captain America: Steve Rogers, Steve wields a new version of the triangular shield that can deploy an energy blade on its pointy end and can be divided in two, allowing him to use both halves in combat.

Marvel Cinematic Universe version

Captain America's shield is a recurring item throughout the Marvel Cinematic Universe franchise. Like its comic book counterpart, it is circular, relatively lightweight, and made of the nearly indestructible Wakandan metal, vibranium. It is created by Howard Stark and given to Steve Rogers during World War II. Within the MCU, the shield is seen as a symbol of Captain America's strength and legacy.

Appearances
In Iron Man (2008), a partially completed replica of the shield appears when Pepper Potts watches Tony Stark trying to remove his damaged armor. Stark subsequently used the alloy of a prototype made by his father to create his Iron Man armor.
In Iron Man 2 (2010), Stark's replica of the shield is noticed by Phil Coulson and it is subsequently used to hold the apparatus that allows Stark to discover a new element, 'badassium'.
In Captain America: The First Avenger (2011), Steve Rogers uses an ornamental version of the triangular shield during World War II on a musical tour with the USO promoting war bonds. He then uses that shield in his first combat mission. It is rendered useless after Johann Schmidt punches a large dent in it. He later notices an unadorned circular shield among Howard Stark's proposed weapons, which Stark says is made of a rare metal called Vibranium that is much stronger and one-third the weight of steel. Although Stark says it is a prototype, Rogers decides to  use it after it stops .45 caliber bullets shot at it by Peggy Carter. It is painted into the familiar red, white and blue pattern modeled after the colors of the American flag. Rogers uses the shield throughout the war. It protects Rogers from not only standard weapons, but also the energy-based weapons Hydra uses that are powered by the Tesseract. Rogers also uses the shield as an offensive weapon and becomes highly skilled in accurately throwing, deflecting, and retrieving it. Rogers has the shield with him when he is frozen in 1945. In 2011, Rogers and the shield are discovered by S.H.I.E.L.D. agents in the Arctic within a crashed, frozen aircraft.
In The Avengers (2012), Rogers uses the shield while fighting against Loki and is able to deflect an energy blast from his Mind Stone-powered scepter. The shield also guards Rogers from Thor's hammer Mjolnir, and the subsequent shockwave created when the two weapons collide causes both Thor and Rogers to fall to the ground and decimates nearby foliage. He also uses the shield during the battle against the Chitauri, and Stark deflects his energy beams off it to amplify their power.
In Iron Man 3 (2013), Trevor Slattery is seen with a tattoo depicting the shield on the back of his neck.
In Thor: The Dark World (2013), Loki's illusion impersonating Rogers also depicts a recreation of his shield.
In Captain America: The Winter Soldier (2014), Rogers uses his shield while fighting against Georges Batroc and his men. It protects both him and Natasha Romanoff from a high powered explosive. during that mission, the red rings of the shield are painted a dull light blue, presumably for stealth. Restored to its original colours, he later uses it to crash through walls in an office building while chasing the Winter Soldier. When Rogers throws it at the Winter Soldier, he uses his metal arm to catch and throw the shield back, much to Rogers' surprise. Rogers uses the shield to absorb some of the impact after he jumps from the Triskelion building and lands unharmed hundreds of feet below. He also uses it to take down a Quinjet and it protects him and Romanoff against a ballistic missile. He later uses it in confrontations against the Winter Soldier, where it counters the latter's metal arm and also takes a direct hit from a grenade launcher without damage.
In Avengers: Age of Ultron (2015), the handles of the shield are outfitted with magnetic elements, allowing Rogers to better control the shield and call it back to his gauntlets. Rogers throws and calls it back to him while riding his motorcycle into battle. He and Thor combine the shield and Mjolnir to create massive shockwaves capable of destroying Hydra tanks. During Ultron's initial attack, Clint Barton accurately throws the shield to Rogers who uses it to completely obliterate an Ultron sentry. He continues to use it in combat throughout against Ultron, his sentries, and Pietro Maximoff, the latter of which he knocks unconscious with it. Ultron laments that the shield, which he calls a "frisbee", is an example of human foolishness given the versatility of the vibranium it is made of. During his confrontation with Ultron, Rogers loses the shield when it falls off a truck but it is retrieved by Romanoff and returns it to Rogers. The shield guards against and reflects Ultron's energy beams and pierces Ultron's shoulder when Rogers kicks it at him. He later throws the shield to Romanoff during the Battle of Sokovia, and she uses it to defend herself against Ultron's sentries.
In Captain America: Civil War (2016), Rogers uses the shield throughout. During his fight with Brock Rumlow, he throws the shield high into the air to protect himself and nearby civilians after an explosive device is thrown and sticks to it. He uses the shield as he attempts to protect Barnes from law enforcement in Bucharest. When he confronts T'Challa, the shield is scratched by T'Challa's vibranium claws. The United Nations seizes the shield temporarily until it is stolen and returned to Rogers by Sharon Carter. Later, the shield is temporarily stolen by Peter Parker but quickly returned to Rogers by Scott Lang. He uses the shield in confrontations with Parker, T'Challa, James Rhodes, and Stark. Barnes uses the shield to attack Rhodes and Stark as well. During his final confrontation with Stark, Rogers uses it to disable some of his armor's flight capability, deflect Stark's energy beams, and finally in combination with Barnes to overwhelm Stark. After he uses the shield to destroy Stark's arc reactor and disable the Iron Man armor. As Rogers leaves with Bucky, Stark calls out that his father, Howard, made the shield for Rogers and that he does not deserve it. Rogers' only response is to leave the shield with Stark.
In Spider-Man: Homecoming (2017), video footage captured by Spider-Man during the events of Civil War, depicting the title character stealing the shield from Rogers, is shown. 
In Avengers: Endgame (2019), Stark returns the shield to Rogers as a gesture of reconciliation between them. Rogers takes the shield with him when he time travels via the Quantum Realm to an alternate 2012, where he faces an alternate version of himself who mistakes him for Loki in disguise, leading to the two versions to use their shields to fight each other. Later, during the battle with an alternate Thanos, Rogers proves worthy of using Thor's hammer Mjolnir, and combines Mjolnir with his shield for combination attacks. However, the shield is fractured by Thanos' double-sided blade, with a fractured third of it being broken off by Thanos's attack. Just before going to confront Thanos alone, Rogers uses the shield's strap to set his injured arm. Following the Avengers' victory, an elderly Rogers, returning from an alternate timeline, bequeaths a new alternate shield, now fully repaired and with a slight design change to the star in the center, to Sam Wilson.
 In The Falcon and the Winter Soldier (2021), Wilson gives the shield to the US government to be placed in the Smithsonian museum exhibit dedicated to Rogers. The government then gives the shield to John Walker, who they name as the new Captain America. Walker uses the shield in combat throughout the series and proves proficient in using it. Karli Morgenthau, leader of the Flag Smashers, calls the shield a "symbol of a bygone era" and believes it should be destroyed. During a confrontation with the Dora Milaje, Walker briefly loses the shield which is handled with expertise by one of the warriors, although Ayo orders it returned to Walker. After Walker injects himself with the Super Soldier Serum and witnesses his partner Lemar Hoskins killed by Morgenthau, he murders another Flag Smasher with the shield while a horrified crowd watches and records him, and with the shield partially bloodstained. Following this, the shield is recovered by Wilson and Barnes, and Wilson trains in becoming proficient with it. Wilson, taking on the Captain America mantle, uses the shield to defeat the Flag Smashers.
In Eternals (2021), the triangular shield used by Rogers in his USO shows is shown to be in the possession of Kingo.
Alternate versions of the shield appears in the animated series What If...?.
An alternate version of the shield is used by Peggy Carter in "What If... Captain Carter Were the First Avenger?". After she is enhanced by the Super Soldier Serum and becomes Captain Carter, Howard Stark gifts her the shield with a United Kingdom-style design as opposed to the original American one. She uses the shield in combat throughout the episode.
An alternate version of the shield appears in "What If... T'Challa Became a Star-Lord?" as part of the Collector's collection on Knowhere.
In Spider-Man: No Way Home (2021), the Statue of Liberty is shown undergoing construction to add the shield to its design. The shield add-on is damaged during Peter Parker's battle with Norman Osborn. 
An alternate version of the shield appears in Doctor Strange in the Multiverse of Madness (2022), used by Captain Carter in an alternate reality called Earth-838. The shield appears identical to the one used by the other Captain Carter in What If...?. Carter uses the shield to battle Wanda Maximoff. However, she is killed when Wanda bisects her with the shield.

Concept and development 
In production for Captain America: The First Avenger, the shield, which is depicted as both a defensive tool and a weapon, came in four types: metal, fiberglass, rubber, and computer graphics (CG). Prop master Barry Gibbs specified that "We had the 'hero shield,' which was made of aluminum, for our beauty shots [and] close-up work. We then created a lighter shield that was aluminum-faced with a fiberglass back, for use on a daily basis. ... And then we had a stunt shield made of polyurethane, which is sort of a synthetic rubber ... and we made an ultrasoft one we put on [Evans'] back, so that if there were an accident, it wouldn't hurt him." Visual effects supervisor Christopher Townsend said Evans "would practice swinging the practical shield so he knew the arc and the speed at which he should move. We would take the shield from him and shoot the scene with him miming it. Then we would add in a CG shield".

The premise of The Falcon and the Winter Soldier revolves around a moment in the film Avengers: Endgame (2019) which depicts Steve Rogers bequeathing the shield and the mantle of Captain America to his friend Sam Wilson. Marvel Studios chief executive Kevin Feige said this was intended to be a "classic passing of the torch from one hero to another", but when Marvel Studios got the opportunity to make television series for Disney+ they decided to expand this into an entire story about Wilson, who is a Black man, becoming Captain America, with the shield serving as a symbol for the superhero title. Mackie said the series would explore Wilson's backstory and treat him as a "regular guy" in a world of superheroes, while "walk[ing] the line of who is going to take up the [Captain America] shield" after Endgame.

Other versions
In the 1998-1999 time travel mini-series Avengers Forever, various future and alternate versions of Captain America are shown with many different variations of the shield.
In the Marvel manga stories, Captain America uses a photonic shield before his death in Volumes 1 and 2, and his bodyguards use shields of metal. The shield also appears in the Rings of Fate mini-series, having been acquired by Carol Danvers after Elektra stole it from Avengers Mansion when she uses the costume of Captain America.
 Captain Mexica is an alternate world version of Captain America from a dimension where the Aztec Empire never fell. His shield is used by Machine Man as a weapon during a zombie incursion; Mexica himself is slain.
 Ultimate Captain America uses a shield of pure Adamantium, although that metal may not possess the same properties in the Ultimate Marvel universe as it does in the mainstream Marvel Universe. The shield was destroyed when Gregory Stark smashed it with Thor's hammer, though Captain America would wield another later.
 In Ultimate Nightmare, Ultimate Captain America encounters his Russian counterpart, who has been driven mad due to being trapped in an underground complex for many years. He has created a "replica" of the shield, which turns out to be made out of scrap metal and human remains and grafted directly onto his forearm, and which proves far less powerful than Captain America's own shield.

In other media

Television

 In the 1970s Captain America TV movies, Steve Rogers is given a transparent plexiglass shield painted with concentric stripes (red and clear transparent) and a central star. The shield was designed to act as the windscreen for his motorcycle, but could be detached and used in its traditional offensive / defensive role when Rogers goes on foot. Furthermore, the shield can apparently return to Rogers in a smooth arc when thrown without needing to be ricocheted and with enough force to knock a man down in the return path.
 In 2003, the company Factory X released a line of licensed prop replicas of items from the Marvel Universe. An aluminum replica of Captain America's shield was among their initial line up of props, and was limited to a production of 2,525 pieces.
 In the closing of the March 12, 2007 episode of The Colbert Report, Stephen Colbert read a letter from Joe Quesada in response to Colbert's earlier comments toward Captain America. He was then presented with what was said to be Captain America's indestructible shield, reportedly willed to Colbert in the event of Cap's "death". The shield was originally credited to be one of the Factory X replicas, but this is not the case. The shield given to Colbert was originally acquired by the long-time writer and editor (and late) Mark Gruenwald, who either commissioned it or received it as a gift. It eventually found its way into the hands of Marvel editor Tom Brevoort, and was kept in his office until being passed on to Colbert. In a pre-show conversation with a studio audience, Colbert, speaking out of character, said that when his wife saw the shield and the accompanying note, she started crying. He confessed he was bemused by her reaction to a fictional character sending a prop shield to a fictional version of himself. The shield was put on display hanging on the wall along with other trophies on The Colbert Report set for every episode afterwards. After The Colbert Report ended, the shield was moved to the set of Colbert's next talk show, The Late Show with Stephen Colbert where it has been on display since.
 In the Avengers: Earth's Mightiest Heroes episode "A Day Unlike Any Other", Loki uses his magic to shatter Captain America's shield while taunting him. In the episode "Behold... The Vision!", Captain America's shield is restored by the Black Panther and scientists in Wakanda using the vibranium machine that fused the pieces back together.
 The adamantium-vibranium alloy version of the shield becomes the main plot device for the story in the Ultimate Spider-Man episode "Not a Toy".

Film
In the 1990 live-action movie Captain America, Steve Rogers/Captain America uses a metal shield of similar design.
In the animated movie Ultimate Avengers, based loosely on The Ultimates, Captain America uses a shield made from vibranium and adamantium. Captain America received the shield while it was still a prototype. With this new shield, he fought against the Chitauri alongside the Avengers. Before then, he used a triangular shield that he was fond of. The composition of the triangular shield remains unrevealed. It did prove to be effective against the bullets of German soldiers, but was not of practical use when he could use much more advanced technology.
In the 2021 action comedy Free Guy, which takes place in a video m-game world, Ryan Reynolds' character produces the Marvel Studios version of the shield and uses it to defend himself, at which point the Avengers theme is heard. Chris Evans makes a cameo appearance as himself acknowledging the connection. This moment was added to the script shortly before shooting after 20th Century Fox, the studio producing the film, was acquired by Disney.

Impact 
The shield has been used as a promotional symbol associated with the Marvel Cinematic Universe. A model of the shield was sent as a gift by Chris Evans, who plays the role of Steve Rogers in the Marvel Cinematic Universe, to a 6-year-old boy who had sustained injuries when defending his sister from a dog attack. Before the premiere of The Falcon and the Winter Soldier, an image of the shield was projected onto landmarks such as the London Eye and the Singapore Flyer. Students at the Massachusetts Institute of Technology, meanwhile, also paid homage to the shield by covering the university's 'Great Dome' with a design of the shield, drawing approval from Chris Evans on Twitter. The shield has also been included by Epic Games as an in-game accessory in the popular video game Fortnite.

A model of the shield was also held in a swearing-in by San Jose, California Republican councilman Lan Diep, with various speculation that the shield was a metaphor to symbolise opposition to Republican President Donald Trump. The use of the shield as a symbol of American nationalism by Trump supporters in the 2021 storming of the United States Capitol, meanwhile, drew criticism from Neil Kirby, the son of the shield's comics creator, Jack Kirby, who said that the shield symbolized "the absolute antithesis of Donald Trump".

References

Shield
Fictional elements introduced in 1941
Individual shields